Gargždai is a city in western Lithuania located in Klaipėda County. The Minija River flows through the city. Gargždai Stadium is its main sports venue.

Gargždai is the Lithuanian name of the city. Versions of the name in other languages include Polish: Gorżdy, Russian: Горжды Gorzhdy, Belarusian: Го́ржды Horzhdy, Yiddish: גורזד Gorzhd, German: Garsden.

The Holocaust
The number of Jewish residents of Gargzdai killed by the Nazi Einsatzkommando death squad during the Holocaust is at least 500 including 200 men killed on June 24, 1941, and 300 women with children killed on September 14 and 16, 1941. The killings were perpetrated by Einsatzgruppe A under the command of SS Brigadeführer Walter Stahlecker, and documented in the Jäger report.

International relations
In 2015 the development of Gargzdai Industrial Park (GIP) started to take place. It is located on the city boundary, in Gamyklos street. It is expected that the new industrial park will attract foreign investments, create new job vacancies for the unemployed in the region and proclaim the city of Gargzdai in other countries.

Industry
Established in 1993 and now located in Gargždai, Mars Lietuva is one of the biggest Mars Incorporated plants in Europe. With around 800 Associates, "Mars Lietuva" produces more than 85 000 tones of over 400 different recipe varieties and formats of pet food annually, which is mainly exported to over 30 European countries.

Twin towns — Sister cities

Gargždai is twinned with:
 Iława, Poland

References

 
Cities in Lithuania
Cities in Klaipėda County
Municipalities administrative centres of Lithuania
Telshevsky Uyezd
Holocaust locations in Lithuania